Rehana was a film actress in Indian and Pakistani Cinema and was known as The Queen of Charm and The Dancing Damsel of Bombay. She worked in leading roles in films such as Sagai, Tadbir, Hum Ek Hain, Shehnai, Sajan, Samrat and Sargam.

Early life
Rehana was born as Musarrat Jehan in Bombay, British India.

Career

After doing dancing roles and small roles in films like the K. L. Saigal-Suraiya-starrer Tadbir, she got her major break in Hum Ek Hain (1946), which was incidentally  Dev Anand's first film. Sajan (1947) had Rehana in the female lead, and following the success of this film, as well as Shehnai (1947), she became an "overnight star". From 1948 to 1951 was the best phase of her career as she did a variety of films paired opposite most of the top heroes of that time, like Prem Adib in Actress (1948), with Raj Kapoor in Sunehre Din (1949) and Sargam (1950), with Dev Anand in Dilruba (1950), with Shyam in Nirdosh (1950) and Surajmukhi (1950), with Shekhar in Adaa (1951) and with Premnath in Sagai (1951). Two of her biggest hits from these were Sargam (1950) and Sagai (1951).

After 1952, her career sharply went on the decline as films like Rangeeli (1952), Chham Chhama Chham (1952), Hazar Raatein (1953) and Samrat (1954) all sank at the box office. With her career on the decline in India, Rehana migrated to Pakistan with the hope of continuing her career there.

In Pakistan, she worked in Urdu films like Raat ke Rahi, Wehshi, Apna Praya, Shalimar, Aulad and Dil Ne Tujhe Man Liya. In 1995 she was a judge for the Nigar Awards.

Personal life
Rehana married producer Iqbal Shehzad who she worked with in the film Raat Ke Rahi but later they divorced and then she married Sabir Ahmed, a businessman from Karachi. With him she had three children.

Death
She died in Karachi on 23 April 2013.

Controversies

She is regarded as Hindi cinema's first "Jhatka Queen". Her movie Shin Sinaki Boobla Boo (1952) became the first film to be banned by the Ministry of Information and Broadcasting because of its low moral tone, even when it was certified for unrestricted public viewing by the censor board of India. Immense public support for the actress made the information and broadcasting ministry of the central government  bow down and allow the unrestricted release of the film, but the huge delay reduced its success at the box office.

In 2010, Rehana's family filed a case against film producer Ekta Kapoor and director Milan Luthria, at the Allahabad High Court and the legal notice says that the filmmaker has used the name 'Rehana' without their consent in the film Once Upon A Time in Mumbaai and it has maligned her image.

Filmography

Film

References

External links
 

1931 births
20th-century Pakistani actresses
People from Mumbai
Indian film actresses
2013 deaths
Actresses in Hindi cinema
Pakistani film actresses
20th-century Indian actresses
Actresses in Punjabi cinema
21st-century Pakistani actresses
Actresses in Urdu cinema
21st-century Indian actresses